Stephen Gallup Brooks is a Professor of Government in the Department of Government at Dartmouth College.

Academic career

Brooks was educated at the University of California, Santa Cruz (B.A.) and Yale University (Ph.D.). He has taught at Dartmouth College since 2001. Brooks is well known in the international relations community for his contributions to international political economy and American grand strategy. Along with William Wohlforth, he has authored a number of articles related to American foreign policy and has advocated for continued American primacy around the world.

Selected works
"Power Transitions, then and now: Five new structural barriers that will constrain China’s rise,"  China International Strategy Review volume 1, 2019.
"Don't Come Home America: The Case against Retrenchment," with John Ikenberry and William Wohlforth, International Security, Vol. 27, No. 3, Winter 2012/2013.
"Reshaping the World Order: How Washington Should Reform International Institutions," with William Wohlforth, Foreign Affairs, Vol. 88, No. 2, March/April 2009.
"Striking the Balance," with William Wohlforth, International Security, Vol. 30, No. 3, Winter 2005/06. 
"International Relations Theory and the Case Against Unilateralism," with William C. Wohlforth, Perspectives on Politics, Vol. 3, No. 3, September 2005.
"Hard Times for Soft Balancing." with William C. Wohlforth, International Security, Vol. 30, No. 1, Summer 2005. 
"Producing Security: Multinational Corporations, Globalization, and the Changing Calculus of Conflict, Princeton University Press, 2005. 
"Economic Constraints and the Turn Toward Superpower Cooperation in the 1980s," with William C. Wohlforth, in From Conflict Escalation to Conflict Transformation: The Cold War in the 1980s, Olav Njnillstad, ed., Frank Cass, 2004. 
"A Double-Edged Sword: Globalization and Biosecurity," with Kendall Hoyt, International Security, Vol. 28, No. 3: 123–148, Winter 2003/04.   
"American Primacy in Perspective," with William Wohlforth, Foreign Affairs, Vol. 81, No. 4: 20–33, July/August 2002. 
"From Old Thinking to New Thinking in Qualitative Research," with William Wohlforth, International Security, Vol. 26, No.4: 93-111, Spring 2002. 
"Economic Constraints and the End of the Cold War," with William Wohlforth, in Cold War Endgames, William Wohlforth, editor, Penn State University Press, 2002. 
"Power, Globalization, and the End of the Cold War: Reevaluating a Landmark Case for Ideas," with William C. Wohlforth, International Security, Vol. 53, No. 3: 5-53, Winter 2000–01. 
"The Globalization of Production and the Changing Benefits of Conquest," Journal of Conflict Resolution, Vol. 43, No. 5:646-670, October 1999. 
"Dueling Realisms," International Organization, Vol. 51, No. 3: 445–477, Summer 1997.

References

Living people
Dartmouth College faculty
Year of birth missing (living people)
American political scientists